is a Japanese former gymnast who competed in the 1984 Summer Olympics.

References

1958 births
Living people
Japanese male artistic gymnasts
Olympic gymnasts of Japan
Gymnasts at the 1984 Summer Olympics
Olympic bronze medalists for Japan
Olympic medalists in gymnastics
Asian Games medalists in gymnastics
Gymnasts at the 1982 Asian Games
Asian Games gold medalists for Japan
Asian Games silver medalists for Japan
Medalists at the 1982 Asian Games
Medalists at the 1984 Summer Olympics
20th-century Japanese people
21st-century Japanese people